Boris Mikhaylovich Kuznetsov (born 12 June 1947) is a Kazakhstani long-distance runner. He competed in the men's 5000 metres at the 1976 Summer Olympics, representing the Soviet Union.

References

1947 births
Living people
Athletes (track and field) at the 1976 Summer Olympics
Kazakhstani male long-distance runners
Soviet male long-distance runners
Olympic athletes of the Soviet Union
Place of birth missing (living people)